Isham and Burton Latimer railway station was built by the Midland Railway in 1857 to serve the villages of Isham and Burton Latimer on its extension from Leicester to Bedford and Hitchin. It closed in 1950 and the building has since been converted into a house.

Slightly north of it was a branch line which ran until 1959 to Thrapston and Huntingdon.

References

 
 

Disused railway stations in Northamptonshire
Former Midland Railway stations
Railway stations in Great Britain opened in 1857
Railway stations in Great Britain closed in 1950
Charles Henry Driver railway stations
1857 establishments in England
North Northamptonshire